Jonathan Isaiah Jones (born September 20, 1993) is an American football cornerback for the New England Patriots of the National Football League (NFL). He played college football at Auburn and signed with the Patriots as an undrafted free agent in 2016.

High school career
As a junior in high school in 2011, Jones was one of the top high school hurdlers in the country. He placed third in the New Balance Nationals and then won the USA Track and Field Junior Olympics National Championship in the 110-meter hurdles.

College career
Jones was a four-year starter at cornerback at Auburn, and saw his first action as a true freshman in 2012. In August 2013, Jones broke his ankle and played in only five games his sophomore season. In 2014, he earned second-team All-SEC notice and was ninth in the nation with six interceptions and 17 passes defended, he would again earn second-team All-SEC notice during his 2015 senior year.  He had 129 career tackles and seven interceptions in his four years with the Tigers.

Professional career
Jones was projected to be a fourth or fifth round draft pick by NFL draft experts and analysts, but went undrafted in the 2016 NFL Draft possibly due to his lack of height, despite an impressive combine, being a top performer at the 40-yard dash and bench press.

2016
On May 1, 2016, the New England Patriots signed Jones to a three-year, $1.63 million contract as an undrafted free agent that included a signing bonus of $10,000.

He had a strong training camp and preseason edging out fellow undrafted rookie Cre'Von LeBlanc and 2015 seventh-round pick Darryl Roberts for the final cornerback spot on the Patriots 53-man roster thanks to his special teams contributions. Jones saw his first game action in the Patriots season opener against the Arizona Cardinals and recorded a tackle.

In Week 14 against the Ravens, Jones stopped a punt from entering the endzone, pinning the Ravens' offense on the 1-yard line. On the next play, defensive tackle Malcom Brown tackled Ravens' running back Kenneth Dixon in the backfield, resulting in a safety.

On February 5, 2017, Jones was part of the Patriots team that won Super Bowl LI. In the game, the Patriots defeated the Atlanta Falcons by a score of 34–28 in overtime. Coming back from a 25 point deficit in the third quarter.

2017
In 2017, Jones played in all 16 regular-season games with four starts as the team's nickel cornerback and core special teamer. In Week 8 against the Los Angeles Chargers, Jones intercepted Philip Rivers in the final seconds of the game to close out a 21-13 win. In the divisional round of the playoffs, Jones suffered an ankle injury and was placed on injured reserve on January 17, 2018. The Patriots still made it to Super Bowl LII, but lost 41-33 to the Philadelphia Eagles.

2018
In the AFC Championship Game for the 2018 season, held on January 20, 2019, the speedy Jones was utilized by the Patriots to shut down the Kansas City Chiefs' Tyreek Hill, who is also known for his speed. Jones was able to match the speed of Hill, and Hill was only targeted three times by quarterback Patrick Mahomes, finishing the game with just one catch. Jones was credited as a 'big reason why' the Patriots beat the Chiefs and secured a spot in Super Bowl LIII. The Patriots beat the Los Angeles Rams, 13–3, to give Jones his second Super Bowl championship.

2019

On March 12, 2019, the Patriots placed a second-round restricted free agent tender on March 12, 2019.

On April 15, 2019, Jones re-signed with the Patriots on a one-year deal.

On September 7, 2019, Jones signed a three-year, $21 million contract extension with the Patriots, keeping him under contract through the 2023 season.
In week 8 against the Cleveland Browns, Jones forced a fumble off running back Nick Chubb which was recovered by teammate Devin McCourty in the 27-13 win.

2020
In Week 6 against the Denver Broncos, Jones recorded his first interception of the season off a pass thrown by Drew Lock during the 18–12 loss.

2021
In Week 6, Jones suffered a shoulder injury and was placed on injured reserve on October 23, 2021.

2022
Jones returned from his injury in 2022 and started 16 games after switching from slot cornerback to outside cornerback. He set career-highs with 11 passes defensed, four interceptions, and three forced fumbles, all of which led the team.

2023
On March 13, 2023, Jones re-signed with the New England Patriots on a two-year deal.

NFL career statistics

Regular season

References

External links
New England Patriots bio
Auburn Tigers bio

1993 births
Living people
People from Carrollton, Georgia
Sportspeople from the Atlanta metropolitan area
Players of American football from Georgia (U.S. state)
American football cornerbacks
Auburn Tigers football players
New England Patriots players